Nikolai Mikhailovich Lukin (Russian: Николай Михайлович Лукин; July 20, 1885 – July 19, 1940) was a Soviet Marxist historian and publicist. He was a leader among Soviet historians in the 1930s, after the death of Mikhail Pokrovsky.

He was a member of the Russian Social Democratic Labor Party (Bolsheviks) from 1904.

He was appointed an Academician of the Academy of Sciences of the Soviet Union on February 13, 1929, expelled on September 5, 1938, and restored on April 26, 1957.

Biography
Lukin was born in the village of Kuskovo in the Spasskaya volost of the Moscow Governorate (now within the city of Moscow) into the family of an elementary school teacher. A cousin of Nikolai Bukharin, Lukin's sister, Nadezhda Mikhailovna (1887–1940), was Bukharin's first wife.

He graduated with a gold medal from the 2nd Moscow Gymnasium and entered the historical and philological faculty of Moscow University (1903).

Lukin was a member of the Revolution of 1905–1907. In 1906 he became a member of the Moscow Committee of the Russian Social Democratic Labor Party. In 1907 he was arrested and after four months of imprisonment he was exiled to Yaroslavl.

At the end of 1908, he returned to Moscow and was restored at the university, from which he graduated in 1909 with a first degree diploma. His graduation work, "The Fall of the Gironde", carried out under the direction of Robert Wipper, was awarded a faculty prize. At the request of Wipper he was left at the Department of General History to prepare for the professorship. He was appointed Private Associate Professor in the same place (1916).

From 1915, he taught at Moscow University.

He was a participant in the 1917 Revolution, when he joined the group of "Left Communists".

From March 1918 he was an employee of Pravda.

In June 1918, he became a professor of the Socialist Academy (later Communist Academy ) Academy, and a full member on April 27, 1919. From 1919, he also worked at the Faculty of Social Sciences of Moscow State University, where he was dean. In 1921 he worked at the Department of History at the Yakov Sverdlov Communist University, then at the Academy of the General Staff of the Red Army, the Institute of the Red Professors, and a research associate at the Institute of Russian History Association of Research Institutes of Social Sciences.

In 1922, Lukin's book "The Paris Commune of 1871" laid the foundation for a new direction in his scientific research. In it, Academician Lukin noted that the Paris Commune was the first attempt of the proletariat to give the bourgeoisie a general battle, and that is what remained in the memory of subsequent generations.

In 1921, he was a member of the "Rothstein Commission". Since 1927, he was a member of the main editorial board of the Great Soviet Encyclopedia, and together with Fedor Rothstein, editor of the department of modern and recent history of Western countries. In 1928, he was on a two-month scientific trip to France. In 1929, he was involved in the Academic Affairs. Since 1931, he headed the Department of Modern History at first at the Moscow Institute of Philosophy, Literature and History, and since 1934, with the restoration of the History Department at Moscow State University, he headed the Department of Modern History there.

In 1932–1936, director of the Institute of History of the Communist Academy, then, until February 1937, director of the Institute of History of the Academy of Sciences of the Soviet Union, then head of the sector of modern history there. In fact, he headed the delegation of Soviet historians at the 7th International Congress of Historians in Warsaw (1933).

In 1933–1938, the editor-in-chief of the journal "Marxist Historian", in 1926, entered its first editorial board.

In May 1937, Lukin declared: "We, comrades, are undoubtedly facing the danger of a new world war, a war that will be a decisive clash of two systems – socialist and capitalist".

On August 22, 1938, Academician Lukin was arrested, and on May 26, 1939, he was sentenced by the Military Collegium of the Supreme Court of the Soviet Union, which stated that Nikolai Lukin was "found guilty of committing crimes under Articles 17-58-8 and 58-11 of the Criminal Code Code of the Russian Soviet Federative Socialist Republic, and sentenced to imprisonment in forced labor camps for a term of 10 years with a defeat in political rights for five years and confiscation of all personally owned property. The verdict is final and not subject to appeal". At the trial, Nikolai Lukin said: "I ask the court to consider that, due to my painful condition, I could not tolerate physical influences, as a result of which I slandered myself and slandered others".

He died in custody. Nikolai Lukin was buried at the Vagankovo Cemetery.

On March 16, 1957, the Military Collegium of the Supreme Court of the Soviet Union adopted a ruling according to which the sentence against Nikolai Lukin of May 29, 1939, was quashed "for lack of corpus delicti".

Main works
"Maximilian Robespierre" (1919; 2nd Edition – 1924);
"Paris Commune of 1871" (1922; 2nd Edition – 1924; 3rd – 1926; 4th – 1932);
"From the History of Revolutionary Armies. Lectures" (1923);
"The Recent History of Western Europe" (1923; 2nd Edition – 1925);
"Essays on the Recent History of Germany. 1890–1914" (1925);
"The Problem of Studying the Era of Imperialism" (1930);
Selected Works. Volume 1–3. Moscow, 1960–1963.

References

Sources
Europe in Modern and Contemporary Times. Collection of Articles in Memory of Academician Nikolai Lukin. Moscow, 1966
Lukin Nikolai Mikhailovich // Great Soviet Encyclopedia: in 30 Volumes / Editor–in–Chief Alexander Prokhorov – 3rd Edition – Moscow: Soviet Encyclopedia, 1969–1978

Alexander Chudinov. Warring Historian: Nikolai Lukin // Historian and Power: Soviet Historians of the Stalin Era. Saratov, 2006
Alexander Chudinov. Nikolai Lukin: at the Origins of Soviet Historiography // Alexander Chudinov. French Revolution: History and Myths. Moscow: Science, 2007

External links
Profile of Nikolai Mikhailovich Lukin on the official website of the Russian Academy of Sciences
An Article in the Great Russian Encyclopedia

Lukin, Nikolai Mikhailovich. On the Chronos website.
Historical Background on the website of the Archive of the Russian Academy of Sciences
Biographical Sketch

1885 births
1940 deaths
Full Members of the USSR Academy of Sciences
20th-century Russian historians
Bolsheviks
Left communists
Russian Marxist historians
Soviet Marxist historians
Historians of the French Revolution
Soviet historiographers